Rajakhera Legislative Assembly constituency is one of the 200 Legislative Assembly constituencies of Rajasthan state in India.

It is part of Dholpur district.

Members of the Legislative Assembly

Election results

2018

See also
 List of constituencies of the Rajasthan Legislative Assembly
 Dholpur district

References

Dholpur district
Assembly constituencies of Rajasthan